USS Tonawanda was one of four s built for  the United States Navy during the American Civil War of 1861–1865. Commissioned in 1865 after the war ended in May, the ship was decommissioned at the end of the year, but was reactivated to serve as a training ship at the United States Naval Academy in 1866. She was renamed Amphitrite in 1869 and was decommissioned again in 1872. The monitor was sold for scrap the following year. The Navy Department evaded the Congressional refusal to order new ships by claiming that the Civil War-era ship was being repaired while building a new monitor of the same name.

Description
The Miantonomoh class was designed by John Lenthall, Chief of the Bureau of Construction and Repair, although the ships varied somewhat in their details. Her crew consisted of 150 officers and enlisted men.

Tonawanda was powered by four inclined horizontal-return connecting-rod steam engines designed by the Engineer-in-Chief of the Navy, Benjamin F. Isherwood. Each pair of engines drove a propeller shaft using steam generated by four Martin vertical water-tube boilers. She was designed to carry  of coal.

Armament and armor
Her main battery consisted of four smoothbore, muzzle-loading,  Dahlgren guns mounted in two twin-gun turrets, one each fore and aft of the single funnel.

The armor of the gun turret consisted of ten layers of one-inch plates and the pilot house had eight layers. The bases of the funnel and the ventilator were also protected by unknown thicknesses of armor.

Construction and career
Tonawanda, named after Tonawanda Creek, New York, was laid down in 1863 at the Philadelphia Navy Yard, Philadelphia, Pennsylvania, launched on 6 May 1864, and commissioned on 12 October 1865 with Commander William Ronckendorff in command. Completed too late for service in the war, Tonawanda was decommissioned at the Washington Navy Yard on 22 December. She was reactivated on 23 October 1866 to serve as a training ship at the United States Naval Academy in Annapolis, Maryland. The ship was renamed Amphitrite on 15 June 1869 and she was decommissioned in 1872. By this time her wooden hull was rotting and she was sold for scrap in 1873 to Harlan and Hollingsworth Co. of Wilmington, Delaware. Although Congress was informed by the Navy Department that the Civil War-era ship was being repaired, a new iron-hulled monitor of the same name was built with repair money and the proceeds of her sale because Congress refused to fund any new construction at this time.

Citations

References 

 
 

 

Miantonomoh-class monitors
Ships built in Philadelphia
1864 ships
American Civil War monitors of the United States